The Lion's Mound ("Lion's Hillock/Knoll"; ,  "Lion of Waterloo") is a large conical artificial hill located in Wallonia in the municipality of Braine-l'Alleud (Dutch: Eigenbrakel), Belgium. King William I of the Netherlands ordered its construction in 1820, and it was completed in 1826. It commemorates the location on the battlefield of Waterloo where a musket ball hit the shoulder of William II of the Netherlands (the Prince of Orange) and knocked him from his horse during the battle. It is also a memorial of the Battle of Quatre Bras, which had been fought two days earlier, on 16 June 1815.

The hill offers a vista of the battlefield, and is the anchor point of the associated museums and taverns in the surrounding Lion's Hamlet. Visitors who pay a fee may climb up the Mound's 226 steps, which lead to the statue and its surrounding overlook (where there are maps documenting the battle, along with observation telescopes); the same fee also grants admission to see the painting Waterloo Panorama.

Design 

At the behest of William I, the Royal Architect Charles Vander Straeten designed the monument. The engineer Jean-Baptiste Vifquain conceived of it as a symbol of the Allied victory rather than as glorifying any sole individual.

Hill 
Earth from many parts of the battlefield, including the fields between La Haye Sainte farm and the Duke of Wellington's sunken lane, is in the huge man-made hill.

Victor Hugo, in his novel Les Misérables, wrote that the Duke of Wellington visited the site two years after the Mound's completion and said, "They have altered my field of battle!" However, the alleged remark by Wellington as described by Hugo was never documented.

Statue 

A statue of a lion standing upon a stone-block pedestal surmounts the hill. Jean-Louis Van Geel (1787–1852) sculpted the model lion, which closely resembles the 16th-century Medici lions. The lion is represented on the crests of both the Royal Arms of England and the Royal Coat of Arms of the United Kingdom as well as on the personal coat of arms of the monarch of The Netherlands, and symbolises courage. Its right front paw is upon a sphere, signifying global victory. William Cockerill's iron foundry in Liège cast the lion, in sections; a canal barge brought those pieces to Brussels; from there, heavy horse-drays drew the parts to Mont-St-Jean, a low ridge south of Waterloo.

There is a legend that the foundry melted down brass from cannons that the French had left on the battlefield, in order to cast the metal lion. In reality, the foundry made nine separate partial casts in iron and assembled those components into one statue at the monument site.

See also 
List of Waterloo Battlefield locations

References

External links 

 The Lion Mound Hamlet: local tourism organisation
 Lion's Mound on BALaT - Belgian Art Links and Tools (KIK-IRPA, Brussels)

Wallonia's Major Heritage
Mountains and hills of Wallonia
Artificial hills
Military monuments and memorials
Monuments and memorials in Belgium
Buildings and structures in Walloon Brabant
Tourist attractions in Walloon Brabant
Sculptures of lions
Waterloo Battlefield locations
Braine-l'Alleud
Commemorative mounds
1826 establishments in the Southern Netherlands